The Wrigley Mansion in Phoenix, Arizona, is a landmark building constructed between 1929 and 1931 by chewing-gum magnate William Wrigley Jr. 
It is also known as William Wrigley Jr. Winter Cottage and as La Colina Solana.

Located at  2501 East Telewa Trail, it sits atop a  knoll with views of greater Phoenix to the south, close to the Arizona Biltmore Hotel, which Wrigley owned.

History
Architect Earl Heitschmidt of Los Angeles designed the home at a cost of $1.2 million, in a combination of styles including Spanish Colonial. The William Simpson Construction Company also of Los Angeles built the home. Much of the extensive tilework was shipped to Phoenix from Wrigley's own factory in Catalina, hauled by mule to the site.

The Wrigleys maintained other residences in Chicago; Philadelphia; Lake Geneva, Wisconsin; Catalina Island; and Pasadena, and used this, the smallest of their houses, for only a few weeks a year. William Wrigley died in 1932, shortly after its completion.

Wrigley Mansion Club
In July 1992, Geordie Hormel bought the mansion and made it available for meetings, conventions and similar functions. Due to zoning regulation, The Wrigley Mansion must operate as a private club.

Landmark designations
The Wrigley Mansion was listed on the National Register of Historic Places in 1989.

The mansion has been designated as a Phoenix Point of Pride.

The mansion has been Winner of The Knot Weddings for 2011, 2009, and 2008.

Gallery

See also

 List of historic properties in Phoenix, Arizona
 Phoenix Historic Property Register

References

External links
 Official Wrigley Mansion Club website

Houses in Phoenix, Arizona
Historic house museums in Arizona
Phoenix Points of Pride
Houses on the National Register of Historic Places in Arizona
National Register of Historic Places in Phoenix, Arizona
Spanish Colonial Revival architecture in the United States
Houses completed in 1932
1932 establishments in Arizona